The 12189 / 12190 Mahakoshal Express is a daily Express train of the Indian Railways, which runs between  railway station of Jabalpur, one of the important cities and military cantonment hub of the Central Indian state Madhya Pradesh and Hazrat Nizamuddin railway station of Delhi, the capital city of India.

The name "Mahakoshal Express" has been given as the city of Jabalpur is located on the region of Mahakoshal, hence the name.

Arrival and departure
Train no.12189 departs from Jabalpur daily at 18:10 hrs, reaching Hazrat Nizamuddin railway station of Delhi the next day at 11:35 hrs.
Train no.12190 departs from Hazrat Nizamuddin railway station of Delhi, daily at 16:10 hrs, reaching Jabalpur the next day at 09:35 hrs.

Route & halts
The train goes via Jhansi. The important halts of the train are:

Jabalpur Junction 
 Katni Junction
 
 Satna
 
 
  
 Jhansi
 Gwalior
 
 Agra Cantt.
  
 
Hazrat Nizamuddin

Coach composition
The train consists of 21 coaches:
 1 AC I tier
 2 AC II tier
 5 AC III tier
 9 sleeper coaches
 2 un-reserved
 2 Power car

Average speed and frequency
The train runs with an average speed of 55 km/h. The train runs on a daily basis.

Loco link
Both train are hauled by a WAP-7 (HOG)-equipped locomotive from Hazrat Nizamuddin to Jabalpur Junction and vice versa.

Rake maintenance 
The train is maintained by the Jabalpur Coaching Depot.

See also
Dayodaya Express
Jabalpur Junction
Bhopal Junction

References

Hazrat Nizamuddin Jabalpur Mahakoshal Express Timetable

Express trains in India
Transport in Delhi
Transport in Jabalpur
Railway services introduced in 2005
Rail transport in Madhya Pradesh
Rail transport in Uttar Pradesh
Rail transport in Delhi
Named passenger trains of India